Yoshkar-Ola (Mari and ) is the capital city of Mari El, Russia. Yoshkar-Ola means “red city” in Mari and was formerly known as Tsaryovokokshaysk before 1919, as Krasnokokshaysk between 1919 and 1927 both after the Malaya Kokshaga River and Charla, by the Mari people.

Yoshkar-Ola was established as a military fortress in 1584, following the Russian conquest of the Mari-inhabited regions of the Volga and its tributaries. It is one of the centers of the Mari people (especially of the Meadow Mari subgroup) and the administrative center of the Yoshkar-Ola city district.

Demographics
Population:

History

Yoshkar-Ola was established as a military fortress in 1584, following the Russian conquest of the Mari region.
Yoshkar-Ola means “red city” in Mari and before 1919 was known as Tsaryovokokshaysk, between 1919 and 1927 also as Krasnokokshaysk  both after the Malaya Kokshaga River and is known as Charla amongst the Mari people.

During the Soviet era, especially after World War II, the city was a regional industrial and transport center and grew to its current size.

The collapse of the Soviet Union removed support for state enterprises, and led to the shutdown of most manufacturing activity in the area.  Much of the city's economic activity was supported by shuttle traders who would transport (often counterfeit) goods from the bustling markets of Moscow to Yoshkar-Ola's bazaars. The sharp decline in living standards led to the emigration of specialized professionals to larger cities in Russia.

Geography
The Malaya Kokshaga River runs through the city.

Administrative and municipal status

Yoshkar-Ola is the capital of the Mari El Republic. Within the framework of administrative divisions, it is, together with ten rural localities, incorporated as the city of republic significance of Yoshkar-Ola —an administrative unit with the status equal to that of the districts. As a municipal division, the city of republic significance of Yoshkar-Ola is incorporated as Yoshkar-Ola Urban Okrug.

Transport
Yoshkar-Ola is linked to other cities and regions in Russia by a series of train and bus routes. The local train station is currently served by a daily train to and from the capital Moscow with other short-service trains running to and from Kazan. Moscow and various other nearby towns and regions can also be reached by buses departing from the local bus station. The Yoshkar-Ola Airport is also located 9 km north of the city and handles small aircraft Moscow-bound flights (Vnukovo International Airport) since April 2012.

Destinations within the city limits can be reached through a network of buses, trolleys, and route taxis, or marshrutkas.

Economy
The 4th Kiev-Zhitomir Rocket Division of the 27th Guards Missile Army of the Strategic Rocket Forces is located nearby.

Yoshkar-Ola has a prison colony, which came to international attention in September 2022 as the location of a Wagner group video in which Yevgeny Prigozhin promised convicts they would be released from prison if they served a six-month combat tour in the war against Ukraine.

Climate
The climate of Yoshkar-Ola is very similar to that of Nizhny Novgorod or Kirov. The city is situated in a warm-summer humid continental climate (Köppen Dfb).

Demographics 
According to the 2021 Census, Yoshkar-Ola has a population of 281,248 people, making it the 71st largest city in Russia. The urban area of the city is 291,892 people. 

Following the 2010 Census, the ethnic makeup of Yoshkar-Ola is:

Education

Yoshkar-Ola is home to 88 educational institutions, among them several institutions of higher education, including:
Mari State University
Volga State University of Technology (before 2012, Mari State Technical University)
Interregional Open Social Institute
There are also 30 schools for primary students aged between 7 and 18 and 52 kindergartens.
Additionally, Yoshkar-Ola has many private educational centers offering different qualifications and trainings in such disciplines as foreign languages, computer science and many others.

Twin towns – sister cities

Yoshkar-Ola is twinned with:
 Bourges, France
 Princeton, West Virginia, United States
 Szombathely, Hungary

External links

Official website of Yoshkar-Ola 
Map of Yoshkar-Ola

References

Notes

Sources

Большая Российская энциклопедия (Great Russian Encyclopedia): В 30 т. / Председатель науч.-ред. совета Ю. С. Осипов. Отв. ред С. Л. Кравец. Т. 12. Исландия — Канцеляризмы. — М.: Большая Российская энциклопедия, 2008. — 767 с.

 
Tsaryovokokshaysky Uyezd
Populated places established in 1584